A Housekeeper is a 2002 French comedy film directed by Claude Berri.

Cast 
 Jean-Pierre Bacri - Jacques
 Émilie Dequenne - Laura 
 Brigitte Catillon - Claire
 Jacques Frantz - Ralph
  - Hélène
 Catherine Breillat - Constance
 Apollinaire Louis-Philippe Dogue - Ernest, le barman
 Amalric Gérard - Julien
  - La femme à la terrasse
 Djura - La chanteuse
 Nathalie Boutefeu - La jeune fille au concert

References

External links 

2002 comedy films
2002 films
French comedy films
2000s French films